The Baldin House, near Ebeneezer, Kentucky, United States, was built in c.1850. It was listed on the National Register of Historic Places in 1989.

It is a two-story, three-bay structure with a Gothic Revival-style gabled roofline.

It was deemed significant "as an example of how Mercer County builders interpreted the Gothic Revival style in their choice of a steeply pitched roof, bargeboards on the eaves, and central wall gable to ornament a single-pile, central passage plan with an ell."

References

Houses on the National Register of Historic Places in Kentucky
Gothic Revival architecture in Kentucky
Houses completed in 1850
National Register of Historic Places in Mercer County, Kentucky
1850 establishments in Kentucky
Houses in Mercer County, Kentucky